James Woody is an American college football coach and former player. From 2011 to 2014, he served as the head football coach at Benedict College in Columbia, South Carolina. Woody played college football as a quarterback at Central State University in Wilberforce, Ohio.

Head coaching record

Notes

References

Year of birth missing (living people)
Living people
American football quarterbacks
Benedict Tigers football coaches
Central State Marauders football coaches
Central State Marauders football players
Jackson State Tigers football coaches
Tuskegee Golden Tigers football coaches
Coaches of American football from Washington, D.C.
Players of American football from Washington, D.C.
African-American coaches of American football
African-American players of American football
20th-century African-American sportspeople
21st-century African-American sportspeople